Từ Cung Hoàng thái hậu (1890–1980), was an empress dowager of Vietnam between 1926–1945. She was the mother of emperor Bảo Đại of the Nguyễn dynasty. She was the concubine of emperor Khải Định. She had never been empress consort, but was given the title of empress dowager in her capacity as the mother of the emperor.

References

 Truyện kể về các Vương phi, Hoàng hậu Nhà Nguyễn - Thi Long, Nhà xuất bản Đà Nẵng.

Nguyễn dynasty empresses dowager
1890 births
1980 deaths